The 2021 NACAM Formula 4 Championship season was planned to be the sixth season of the NACAM Formula 4 Championship. It was supposed to begin on 3 June at Autódromo Monterrey in Apodaca and end on 7 November at Autódromo Hermanos Rodríguez in Mexico City after five rounds. However, because of the pandemic issues, four non-championship events were held instead.

México City Grand Prix: NACAM F4 teams and drivers

Race calendar
The calendar was announced on 24 March 2021. The season was set to start with two rounds in the United States and the rest in Mexico. The American rounds were turned into non-championship event, resulting in the season start officially moving to Autódromo Monterrey in June. The round at Autódromo Monterrey on 3–4 June did not take place without any statement from the organizers. The series was due to restart in September. The round at Autódromo Hermanos Rodríguez scheduled for 11–12 September was moved to EcoCentro Expositor Querétaro as the former served as a temporary COVID-19 hospital. With this one also cancelled, a replacement event occurred at Auódromo Miguel E. Abed to act as a warm-up event to the series' support race at the Mexico City Grand Prix.

México City Grand Prix: NACAM F4 Race Results

References

External links 
  

2021
Nacam
Nacam
NACAM